Polypoetes opaca is a moth of the family Notodontidae. It is found in Bolivia.

References

Moths described in 1925
Notodontidae of South America